Hammer and Tongs is the second album from the Scottish rock group Goodbye Mr Mackenzie. It was recorded in Germany in 1989, at Berlin's Hansa Ton Studios just as the Fall of the Berlin Wall occurred. The album sat on the shelf for almost 18 months, in which time the band were transferred across EMI record labels, from Capitol to Parlophone, who released two singles from the album in 1990. Parlophone sold the band's record deal to Radioactive Records and MCA, who released Hammer and Tongs in the United Kingdom in early 1991 and encouraged the band to record a new song "Now We Are Married" to promote the release.

Later that year, Radioactive, and their partners MCA, repackaged the album for international release by including several stand-out tracks from the band's debut album Good Deeds and Dirty Rags and eponymously re-titling the album as Goodbye Mr. Mackenzie.

Paul Davies of Q Magazine called the album a "more than adequate follow up."

Track listing
All songs written by Metcalfe and Kelly, except where noted.

"Blacker Than Black"
"Bold John Barleycorn"
"Diamonds"
"The Burning"
"Now We Are Married"
"Sick Baby" (Metcalfe, Kelly, Scobie, Wilson, Duncan)
"Down to the Minimum" (Metcalfe, Kelly, Scobie, Wilson, Duncan)
"She's Strong"
"Love Child"
"Tongue-Tied"

Unreleased Parlophone version

"Working on a Shoe-fly"

2006 Cherry Red re-issue bonus tracks

"Friday's Child" (Lee Hazlewood)
"Candelstick Park II
"Candy Says" (Lou Reed)
"Now We Are Married" (Extended version)

Personnel
Goodbye Mr Mackenzie
Martin Metcalfe - lead vocals
John Duncan - guitar 
Fin Wilson - bass guitar 
Shirley Manson - keyboards, backing vocals 
Rona Scobie - keyboards, backing vocals 
Derek Kelly - drums

References

External links
Goodbye Mr. Mackenzie website
Hammer and Tongs discography
Goodbye Mr. Mackenzie discography

1991 albums
Goodbye Mr Mackenzie albums
Capitol Records albums